{{Speciesbox
| status = NT
| status_system = IUCN3.1
| status_ref = 
| genus = Afrocarpus
| species = dawei
| authority = (Stapf) C.N.Page
| synonyms_ref     = 
| synonyms         = * Podocarpus dawei Stapf 1917 
Podocarpus usumbarensis Pilg. var. dawei <small>(Stapf) Melv. 1954</small>
}}Afrocarpus dawei is a species of conifer in the family Podocarpaceae. It is native to Africa, where it occurs in the Democratic Republic of the Congo, Tanzania, and Uganda.

This species is a tree that grows in swampy forest habitat that is flooded in the rainy season. It is associated with Baikiaea insignis and Mimusops species.A. dawei'' is found in the Minziro Forest of Tanzania and the adjacent Sango Bay forests of Uganda, located west of Lake Victoria. The Kagera River sustains swamp forests and a high groundwater table that supports evergreen lowland forests.

This tree is valuable as timber because it grows a long trunk without many branches. It is likely overharvested, one reason that it is considered to be a near-threatened species.

References

External links
 Afrocarpus dawei. The Gymnosperm Database.

Podocarpaceae
Flora of the Democratic Republic of the Congo
Flora of Tanzania
Flora of Uganda
Trees of Africa
Afromontane flora
Near threatened plants
Near threatened biota of Africa